Manthimba was the capital of the Maravi Kingdom.

References

Former cities
History of Malawi
States and territories established in the 16th century